Diego Corrientes may refer to:

 Diego Corrientes Mateos (1757-1781) a Spanish bandit
 Diego Corrientes (1914 film), a silent Spanish film directed by Alberto Marro 
 Diego Corrientes (1924 film), a silent Spanish film directed by José Buchs 
 Diego Corrientes (1937 film), a Spanish film directed by Ignacio F. Iquino 
 Diego Corrientes (1959 film), a Spanish film directed by Antonio Isasi-Isasmendi